Sebastian Chang Hwan Kim (born 18 October 1955) is a Korean theologian specialized in public theology and Korean Christianity. He is currently Professor of Theology and Public Life and assistant provost for the Korean Studies Center at Fuller Theological Seminary.

Education and academic career
Kim earned his bachelor of electronic communication engineering at Hanyang University in 1980 and his master of divinity at Presbyterian University and Theological Seminary, Seoul, South Korea in 1991. After obtaining a master of theology at Fuller Seminary in 1993, he worked as a visiting lecturer at Union Biblical Seminary, Pune, India for four years. In 1997, he started his PhD in theology at Fitzwilliam College, University of Cambridge and graduated in 2001.

After completing his PhD, Kim taught world Christianity at the University of Cambridge and was the director of the Christianity in Asia project. He joined the faculty of York St John University in 2005 and was the Chair in Theology and Public Life in the School of Humanities, Religion and Philosophy for 12 years. In July 2017, he moved to Fuller as Professor of Theology and Public Life and assistant provost for the Korean Studies Center.

Kim was the founding editor of International Journal of Public Theology, a journal he edited from 2007 to 2017. With Katie Day, he co-edited The Companion to Public Theology, which was named one of 2017’s Outstanding Academic Titles by Choice magazine.

Personal life
He is married to Kirsteen Kim, a pneumatologist and professor of theology and world Christianity at Fuller Seminary. Together they have two children.

Writings

References

1955 births
Hanyang University alumni
Fuller Theological Seminary alumni
Alumni of Fitzwilliam College, Cambridge
Fuller Theological Seminary faculty
Living people
World Christianity scholars
Public theologians
South Korean theologians
Academic staff of Union Biblical Seminary, Pune